Rotglà i Corberà is a municipality in the comarca of Costera in Valencia, Spain.

References

Municipalities in the Province of Valencia
Costera
Populated places established in 1611